May 8 – Eastern Orthodox Church calendar – May 10

All fixed commemorations below celebrated on May 22 by Orthodox Churches on the Old Calendar.

For May 9th, Orthodox Churches on the Old Calendar commemorate the Saints listed on April 26.

Saints

 Prophet Isaiah (8th century BC)
 Great-martyr Christopher of Lycia (c. 249–251), and with him:
 Martyrs Callinica (Callinike of Lycia), and Aquilina (Aquilina of Lycia) (c. 249 – 251)
 Saint Maximus III of Jerusalem, Patriarch (350)  (see also: August 26)
 Saint Shio of Mgvime, monk, of Georgia (6th century)
 Monk-martyr Nicholas of Vouneni, in Thessaly (901)

Pre-Schism Western saints

 Saint Beatus, Apostle of Switzerland (2nd century)
 Martyrs Epimachus and Gordianus of Rome, in the persecution of Decius (c. 249 – 251)
 Saint John of Châlon, third Bishop of Châlon-sur-Saône in France (c. 475)
 Saint Gerontius, bishop of Cervia near Ravenna in Italy, martyr (c. 501)
 Saint Sanctan, Bishop of Kill-da-Les and Kill-na-Sanctan near Dublin in Ireland (6th century)
 Blessed Adalgar, third archbishop of Hamburg-Bremen (909)
 Saint Vincent, Abbot of St Peter de Montes in Spain, a disciple and successor of St. Gennadius of Astorga (c. 950)
 Saint Gregory, Bishop of Ostia (c. 1044)

Post-Schism Orthodox saints

 Saint Dmitry Donskoy, Prince of Moscow (1389)
 New Hieromartyr Methodius of Amaria, Crete (1793)
 Saint Joseph (Litovkin) of Optina, Hiero-schema-monk of Optina Monastery (1911)
 Venerable Elder Ieronymos of Simonopetra (1957) (see also: April 26 - OS)

New martyrs and confessors

 New Hieromartyr Demetrius Voskresensky, Priest (1938)
 New Hieromartyr Basil Kolosov, Priest (1939)
 New Martyrs of Slobozhanschyna (Slobodskaya Ukraine).

Other commemorations

 Translation of the Relics of Saint Nicholas from Myra to Bari in 1087.  (see also: May 20 – Greek)
 Zaraysk Icon of St. Nicholas the Wonderworker (1225)
 Translation of the relics (1775) of Child-martyr Gabriel of Slutsk (1690)

Icon gallery

Notes

References

Sources
 Complete List of Saints. Protection of the Mother of God Church (POMOG).
 May 9, OCA – The Lives of the Saints.
 May 9/22, Orthodox Calendar (PRAVOSLAVIE.RU).
 May 22 / May 9, HOLY TRINITY RUSSIAN ORTHODOX CHURCH (A parish of the Patriarchate of Moscow)
 New Martyrs and Confessors of the Soviet Yoke, Saints of the Ukrainian Orthodox Church.
 Dr. Alexander Roman. May. Calendar of Ukrainian Orthodox Saints (Ukrainian Orthodoxy – Українське Православ'я).
 May 9. Latin Saints of the Orthodox Patriarchate of Rome.
 May 9. The Roman Martyrology.
Greek Sources
 Great Synaxaristes:  9 ΜΑΪΟΥ. ΜΕΓΑΣ ΣΥΝΑΞΑΡΙΣΤΗΣ.
  Συναξαριστής. 9 Μαΐου. ECCLESIA.GR. (H ΕΚΚΛΗΣΙΑ ΤΗΣ ΕΛΛΑΔΟΣ). 
Russian Sources
  22 мая (9 мая). Православная Энциклопедия под редакцией Патриарха Московского и всея Руси Кирилла (электронная версия). (Orthodox Encyclopedia – Pravenc.ru).
  9 мая (ст.ст.) 22 мая 2013 (нов. ст.). Русская Православная Церковь Отдел внешних церковных связей. (DECR).

May in the Eastern Orthodox calendar